Hans Haferkamp (11 October 1921 – 30 June 1974) was a German international footballer. Born in Osnabrück, Haferkamp played as a forward for VfL Osnabrück, and won four caps for West Germany between 1951 and 1952.

References

External links
 

1921 births
1974 deaths
Sportspeople from Osnabrück
German footballers
Germany international footballers
Association football forwards
VfL Osnabrück players
Footballers from Lower Saxony